The 1970 WCHA men's ice hockey tournament was the 11th conference playoff in league history. The tournament was played between March 12 and March 14, 1970. All East Regional games were played at the Duluth Arena Auditorium in Duluth, Minnesota, while West Regional games were held at the DU Arena in Denver, Colorado. By winning the regional tournaments, both the East Regional Champion†, Michigan Tech, and West Regional Champion‡, Wisconsin, were invited to participate in the 1970 NCAA University Division men's ice hockey tournament.

Format
The top eight teams in the WCHA, according to their final conference standings, were eligible for the tournament and were seeded No. 1 through No. 8. The eight teams were then divided into two separate groups by placing all even-numbered seeds in one group (2, 4, 6, 8) and the odd-numbered seeds (1, 3, 5, 7) in the other group. Using the location of the top seeds in each of the groups, the odd-numbered group (containing Minnesota) was placed in the east region which was held at the Duluth Arena Auditorium while the odd-numbered grouping (containing Denver) was placed in the west region which was held at the DU Arena. Once each regional group was set the teams were reseeded No. 1 to No. 4 according to their final conference standings. Because Minnesota-Duluth was placed in the West Region despite their building hosting the East Region they were swapped with the equivalent seed (Michigan State) in the East Region to allow them to play in their home venue. In the first round the first and fourth seeds and the second and third seeds in each region were matched in a single game with the winners advancing to their regional final games. The winners of the two championship games were declared as co-conference tournament champions.

Conference standings
Note: GP = Games played; W = Wins; L = Losses; T = Ties; PCT = Winning percentage; GF = Goals for; GA = Goals against

Bracket

Note: * denotes overtime period(s)

East Regional

Semifinals

(1) Minnesota vs. (4) Minnesota-Duluth

(2) Michigan Tech vs. (3) North Dakota

Finals

(1) Minnesota vs. (2) Michigan Tech

West Regional

Semifinals

(1) Denver vs. (4) Michigan State

(2) Wisconsin vs. (3) Michigan

Finals

(1) Denver vs. (2) Wisconsin

Tournament awards
None

See also
Western Collegiate Hockey Association men's champions

References

External links
WCHA.com
1969–70 WCHA Standings
1969–70 NCAA Standings
2013–14 Denver Pioneers Media Guide
2013–14 Michigan Wolverines Media Guide; Through the Years
2013–14 Michigan State Spartans Media Guide; Section 5
2013–14 Minnesota Golden Gophers Media Guide 
2012–13 Minnesota-Duluth Bulldogs Media Guide
2013–14 North Dakota Hockey Media Guide
2003–04 Wisconsin Badgers Media Guide

WCHA Men's Ice Hockey Tournament
Wcha men's ice hockey tournament